Sancton is a surname. Notable people with the surname include:

Thomas Sancton Sr. (1915–2012), American novelist and journalist, father of Tom
Tom Sancton (born 1949), American writer, jazz clarinetist, and educator